is a Japanese footballer who plays as a forward for Nankatsu SC.

Club statistics
.

References

External links
Profile at Nankatsu SC

1989 births
Living people
National Institute of Fitness and Sports in Kanoya alumni
Association football people from Kanagawa Prefecture
Japanese footballers
J1 League players
J2 League players
J3 League players
Sagan Tosu players
Shonan Bellmare players
Thespakusatsu Gunma players
Nankatsu SC players
Association football forwards